Jorge Félix Correia, known as Jorge Félix (born June 21, 1940) is a Brazilian former football player.

Career 
Correia played in 1967 with Portuguesa F.C., and later with Bonsucesso Futebol Clube and Bangu Atlético Clube. In 1970, he played abroad in the Primeira Divisão with Boavista F.C. In 1971, he played in the North American Soccer League with Toronto Metros. In his debut season with Toronto he was named to the NASL Second team. The following season he returned to Boavista, and ultimately had stints with S.C. Farense, and Leixões S.C.

In 1974, he returned to Canada to play in the National Soccer League with First Portuguese. During his tenure with the club he featured in a friendly match with Toronto Croatia against SV Werder Bremen, where he was loaned to Toronto in order to appear in the match. In 1975, he played in the Portuguese Second Division with S.C. Salgueiros.

References 

1940 births
Living people
Brazilian footballers
Associação Portuguesa de Desportos players
Bonsucesso Futebol Clube players
Bangu Atlético Clube players
Boavista F.C. players
Toronto Blizzard (1971–1984) players
S.C. Farense players
Leixões S.C. players
S.C. Salgueiros players
Toronto First Portuguese players
Primeira Liga players
North American Soccer League (1968–1984) players
Canadian National Soccer League players
Segunda Divisão players
Association football midfielders
Brazilian expatriate footballers
Expatriate soccer players in Canada
Brazilian expatriate sportspeople in Canada